Kady Iuri Borges Malinowski (born 2 May 1996) is a Brazilian-Polish professional footballer who plays as an winger or attacking midfielder for Russian club Krasnodar. Starting his career in his native Curitiba, he then played for Estoril and Vilafranquense in Portugal.

Kady Borges then was transferred to Azerbaijani side Qarabağ, helping his team win the Azerbaijan Premier League and the Azerbaijan Cup in his debut season, also becoming the top scorer of the Azerbaijan Premier League with 12 goals. He made his debut in the group stage of European competitions at Qarabağ, also scoring the best goal of the week of the second round of 2021–22 UEFA Europa Conference League group stage.

Career

Coritiba 
Kady Borges started his professional career at Coritiba.

Qarabağ 
On 11 June 2021, Qarabağ announced the signing of Kady Borges on a two-year contract, with the option of an additional year, from Vilafranquense. Kady debuted on 26 June, in a friendly match with Keşlə, during which he scored his first goal for Qarabağ. Kady Borges made his official debut in Qarabağ on 22 July, during UEFA Europa Conference League qualifying match against Israel's F.C. Ashdod. He scored his first goal for Qarabağ in the next UECL match against Cypriot AEL Limassol, in the 87th minute of the match.

On August 15, in a match against Zira, he made his official debut in the Azerbaijan Premier League. Kady Borges scored his first goal in the Premier League on 25 October, in away game against the Səbail. He played his debut game in the group stage of a European tournament on 16 September, during a home match against FC Basel. Kady Borges' first goal during an away match against the Cypriot AC Omonia was chosen as the best goal of the week in the second round of the group stage in UECL. This goal was also nominated for the title of the best goal scored in the group stage of the 2021/22 UECL season. He also scored against the French side Olympique de Marseille during the play-off round of UECL. 

In his debut season, he helped Qarabağ win the Azerbaijan Premier League, win the Azerbaijan Cup and became the top scorer of the Premier League with 12 goals. On 2 August 2022, Kady Borges signed a new five-year contract with Qarabağ.

Krasnodar 
On 4 January 2023, Qarabağ and Krasnodar agreed the transfer of Kady Borges to the Russian club.

Personal life
Born in Brazil, Kady Borges is of Polish descent through his paternal grandfather. He started the naturalization process to gain Polish citizenship in November 2022, with the goal of representing the Poland national team.

Career statistics

Honours
Qarabağ
Azerbaijan Premier League: 2021–22
Azerbaijan Cup: 2021–22

Individual
Azerbaijan Premier League top scorer: 2021–22

References

External links

1996 births
Living people
Footballers from Curitiba
Brazilian footballers
Brazilian people of Polish descent
Association football midfielders
Campeonato Brasileiro Série B players
Liga Portugal 2 players
Azerbaijan Premier League players
Russian Premier League players
Coritiba Foot Ball Club players
Londrina Esporte Clube players
Foz do Iguaçu Futebol Clube players
G.D. Estoril Praia players
U.D. Vilafranquense players
Qarabağ FK players
FC Krasnodar players
Brazilian expatriate footballers
Brazilian expatriate sportspeople in Portugal
Expatriate footballers in Portugal
Brazilian expatriate sportspeople in Azerbaijan
Expatriate footballers in Azerbaijan
Brazilian expatriate sportspeople in Russia
Expatriate footballers in Russia